The College of Amazon (FAAM) is a private college in the Brazilian state of Pará. Established in 2004, it was the second private college in the Ananindeua, Pará city.

History

Courses 

Universities and colleges in Pará
Educational institutions established in 2004
2004 establishments in Brazil